Muhammad Taufik (born 3 January 1957) is an Indonesian politician from Gerindra who is the deputy speaker of Jakarta DPRD.

Having been convicted of corruption in 2004, he received significant attention in 2019 when he successfully filed a lawsuit against the General Elections Commission to run for his second term in the legislative body.

Background
Muhammad Taufik was born in Jakarta on 3 January 1957.

Career
He was the head of the Jakarta office of the General Elections Commission (KPU), but he was sentenced guilty of corruption in 2004 and was imprisoned for 18 months.

Councillor
In the 2014 Indonesian legislative election, Taufik ran as a Gerindra candidate for the Jakarta DPRD and won a seat. He was later appointed as deputy speaker of the body.

Following the 2014 presidential election, in which Prabowo Subianto lost, Taufik demanded the head of KPU be arrested, accusing him of cheating by opening ballot boxes. This statement, delivered in front of a crowd protesting the results, caused KPU officials to report Taufik to the police.

In the same year, after the resignation of previous governor Joko Widodo, Taufik was brought up as a possible candidate to replace either his gubernatorial seat or the deputy governor seat - which was held by Basuki Tjahaja Purnama (Ahok), who strongly protested Taufik's appointment. Later on, the two would come into conflict often, with Taufik boycotting Ahok during his blasphemy trial.

Taufik later proposed that the city government entirely subsidize ticket fees for the Jakarta MRT.

2019 election
For the 2019 election, KPU had introduced a new regulation barring, among others, candidates who had been convicted of graft before from running. Despite this, Taufik registered for reelection, and KPU demanded his party remove him from the candidates list. Taufik then filed an appeal to the Supreme Court of Indonesia, with the  approving him to run. Eventually, he was approved by Jakarta's KPU as one of the candidates.

References

1957 births
Living people
Great Indonesia Movement Party politicians
Jakarta Regional People's Representative Council members
Politicians from Jakarta
Indonesian politicians convicted of corruption